Conza della Campania (or Conza di Campania; formerly called Compsa, commonly known as Conza) is a comune (municipality) and former Latin Catholic (arch)bishopric in the province of Avellino in the region of Campania in southern Italy.

History

Early history 

Compsa was an ancient city of the Hirpini occupied by the Carthaginian conqueror Hannibal in 216 BC.

Medieval and modern history 
During the Early Middle Ages, it was a gastaldate in the Principality of Salerno. In 973, the gastald (city-based Lombard royal domain district administrator and judge) Landulf seized the principality.  Later, it belonged to the Balvano, the Gesualdo, and the Mirelli families.

Recent history 
The town was almost completely destroyed by the 1980 Irpinia earthquake. It was rebuilt in the area called Piano delle Briglie,  from the former center. Conza della Campania is now a turistic attraction, since it can count among its territory the WWF Oasi, including the lake of Conza and the area outside. Conza della Campania has also about 10,000 visitors a year at its Archeological site, Compsa, discovered after the earthquake of 1980 that destroyed the old town.

Main sights 
The main church is the Concattedrale (co-cathedral) of S. Maria Assunta. Other sights include the archaeological area of Compsa and the natural oasis of Lake Conza, an artificial basin on the Ofanto river.

See also 
 List of Catholic dioceses in Italy

References 

Brief description on Italy World Club

External links
 Official website

Cities and towns in Campania